Fox & Friends is an American daily morning news and talk program that airs on Fox News. It premiered on February 1, 1998, and is currently hosted by Steve Doocy, Ainsley Earhardt and Brian Kilmeade on weekdays. Will Cain, Rachel Campos-Duffy and Pete Hegseth host on weekends.

It begins at 6:00 a.m. Eastern Time Zone with the latest Fox News Live headlines and news of the morning and continues with a variety of segments including current events, interviews, updates of news stories with correspondents, political analysis from the hosts, and entertainment segments.

History 
Fox & Friends evolved from Fox X-press, Fox News Channel's original morning news program.

After the September 11 attacks, an additional hour was added to the beginning of the weekday show, but branded as a separate show called Fox & Friends First. It was the first Fox News show to air live for the day, starting at 6:00 a.m. It was discontinued on July 13, 2008, and replaced with an additional hour of Fox & Friends. The Fox & Friends First title was reintroduced on March 5, 2012, also as a separate show airing one hour before the main three-hour program, but using a separate slate of rotating anchors.

Format  

Fox & Friends has been described as being more akin to the Big Three television networks than its cable competitors (particularly CNN This Morning and MSNBC's Morning Joe), with a mix of news, entertainment and lifestyle-oriented segments, and a generally casual presentation. However, as with the morning shows on competing cable news channels, its news content largely concentrates on politics.  Currently, Steve Doocy, Ainsley Earhardt, and Brian Kilmeade co-host the program Monday-Friday. Will Cain, Rachel Campos-Duffy and Pete Hegseth co-host on the weekends.

Some regular fill in hosts include Todd Piro, Katie Pavlich, Joey Jones, Griff Jenkins, Lisa Boothe, Carley Shimkus and Lawrence Jones.

Recurring segments 
 The 'Summer Concert Series' features a live music concert in the Fox News Plaza each Friday from Memorial Day weekend though Labor Day weekend. 
 'So Sue Me' is a segment in which Peter Johnson, Jr. (an appellate and trial lawyer) offers his perspective on current events with legal implications.

Ratings 
The New York Times has reported the show is one of the most successful on the network. After the arrival of Elisabeth Hasselbeck in September 2013, the show climbed 23 percent in total viewers compared to its average for the third quarter of 2013, and 22 percent in the key 25–54 news demo.  For Hasselbeck's first four weeks on the show, Fox & Friends averaged 1.226 million total viewers, up from the 1.058 that the show averaged for the third quarter of the year.

In February 2017, the program's average ratings increased to around 1.7 million viewers, fueled by the recent inauguration of Republican candidate Donald Trump as president.

Political stance 

In 2012, The New York Times wrote that Fox & Friends "has become a powerful platform for some of the most strident attacks on President Obama." The program has provided a platform for Barack Obama religion conspiracy theories and, in May 2012, aired a 4-minute video attacking Obama's record as president. The video was widely criticized as a political attack ad masquerading as journalism; Time magazine television critic James Poniewozik wrote: "It's hard to imagine a more over-the-top parody of Fox News raw-meat-hurling, fear-stoking, base-pleasing agitprop." In response, a Fox News executive vice-president 'disavowed' the video, blaming an associate producer and that the video 'slipped by' senior managers at the network. Fox News stated that the show was entertainment and "does not pretend to be straight news."

Former U.S. president Donald Trump is a regular viewer of Fox & Friends, and praised the program for its favorable coverage of his presidency. Critics noted that Trump often tweeted about stories on Fox & Friends as they aired, creating a "feedback loop" when the stories were subsequently discussed as national issues because they were mentioned by Trump on social media.

Trump was a frequent guest on Fox & Friends before his presidency. In 2018, Fox News announced that he would appear on the show to offer commentary every Monday.

On April 26, 2018, Trump was interviewed by phone on Fox & Friends in a segment that stretched to nearly half an hour, and discussed several recent topics and controversies surrounding himself and his government. Trump said that he might interfere with the Special Counsel investigation, acknowledged that lawyer Michael Cohen had represented Trump in the Stormy Daniels–Donald Trump scandal, and said that he had gotten a card and flowers for Melania Trump, his wife, whose birthday was the same day.

Hosts

Weekdays 
 Steve Doocy, co-host; 1998–present 
 Ainsley Earhardt, co-host; 2016–present
 Brian Kilmeade, co-host; 1998–present
 Janice Dean, co-host/meteorologist; 2004–present
 Carley Shimkus, news anchor, guest co-host; 2021–present (Currently on Maternity Leave)
 Ashley Strohmier, substitute news anchor; 2023—present 
 Lawrence Jones, enterprise reporter, guest co-host; 2021—present

Weekends 
 Will Cain, co-host; 2020–present
 Rachel Campos-Duffy, co-host; 2021–present 
 Pete Hegseth, co-host; 2017–present
 Rick Reichmuth, meteorologist; 2006–present
Lawrence Jones, enterprise reporter, guest co-host; 2021—present

Former 
 Jedediah Bila, weekend co-host from 2019 to 2021 (replaced by Rachel Campos-Duffy)
 Dave Briggs, weekend co-host; left at the end of 2012
 Alisyn Camerota, weekend co-host; left on September 28, 2013
 Gretchen Carlson, weekdays co-host from 2006 to 2013 (replaced by Elisabeth Hasselbeck)   
 Tucker Carlson, weekend co-host from 2012 to 2016
 Kiran Chetry, weekend co-host from 2005 to 2007
 Elisabeth Hasselbeck, weekdays co-host from 2013 to 2015 (replaced by Ainsley Earhardt)
 Ed Henry, weekend co-host from 2017 to 2019 (replaced by Will Cain)
 E. D. Hill, weekdays co-host from 1998 to 2006 (replaced by Gretchen Carlson)
 Juliet Huddy, former weekend and substitute co-host 
 Abby Huntsman, weekend co-host from 2016 to 2018 (replaced by Jedediah Bila)
 Mike Jerrick, former weekend co-host 
 Anna Kooiman, weekend co-host from 2012 to 2016 (replaced by Abby Huntsman)
 Jillian Mele, weekdays news anchor from 2017 to 2021 (replaced by Carley Shimkus)
 Maria Molina, Fox Cast meteorologist from 2010 to 2016
 Clayton Morris, weekend co-host from 2008 to 2017 (replaced by Pete Hegseth)
 Julian Phillips, former weekend co-host
 Kelly Wright, weekend co-host from 2006 to 2008

References

External links 
 
 
 Fox and Friends First

1998 American television series debuts
1990s American television news shows
2000s American television news shows
2010s American television news shows
2020s American television news shows
English-language television shows
Television morning shows in the United States
Fox News original programming
Conservative media in the United States